Harlandale Independent School District is a public school district based in San Antonio, Texas, in the United States.

In 2010, the district was rated "Recognized" by the Texas Education Association, with 18 of 19 schools rated as "Recognized" or "Exemplary." In 2011, the district won the prestigious HEB Excellence in Education Award.

Schools

High schools (Grades 9-12) 
Harlandale High School
 1999-2000 National Blue Ribbon School
McCollum High School
 Frank M. Tejeda Academy
STEM Early College High School

Middle schools (Grades 6-8) 
 Harlandale Middle School
 Kingsborough Middle School
 2001-02 National Blue Ribbon School
 Leal Middle School
 Tejeda Junior Academy
 Terrell Wells Middle School

Elementary schools (Grades PK-5) 
 Adams Elementary School
 Bellaire Elementary School
 Carrol Bell Elementary School
 Collier Elementary School
2000-01 National Blue Ribbon School
Columbia Heights Elementary School
Gilbert Elementary School
Gillette Elementary School
Morrill Elementary School
2003 National Blue Ribbon School
Rayburn Elementary School
2003 National Blue Ribbon School
Schulze Elementary School
Stonewall-Flanders Elementary School
Vestal Elementary School
Wright Elementary School

Notable alumni & students

Jesse Borrego (class of 1980) – actor who played Cruz Candelaria in Blood In Blood Out
Wilbur Huckle (class of 1960) – baseball player and manager in the New York Mets minor league system
Milton A. Lee (class of 1967) – won Medal of Honor in the Vietnam War, killed in action in 1968
Jesse James Leija (class of 1984) – former professional boxer
Leo Pacheco (class of 1976) – state representative
George Boyd Pierce (class of 1959) – former member of the Texas House of Representatives from District 122
Ciro Rodriguez – former U.S. Representative
Tobin Rote (class of 1946) – pro football quarterback, won NFL and AFL championships
Frank Tejeda – U.S. Marine and politician
Fadli Zon – deputy speaker of the Indonesian People's Representative Council

See also
 Harlandale High School#Notable alumni

References

External links 
 

School districts in Bexar County, Texas
School districts in San Antonio